Molino is an unincorporated community in Audrain County, in the U.S. state of Missouri.

History
A post office called Molino was established in 1882, and remained in operation until 1957. The community's name commemorates the Battle of Molino del Rey.

References

Unincorporated communities in Audrain County, Missouri
Unincorporated communities in Missouri